The following is the discography of the band Xscape:

Albums

Studio albums

Compilation albums

Extended plays

Singles

As lead artists 

Note

As featured artists

Soundtrack appearances

Album appearances

Music videos

Notes

References 

Rhythm and blues discographies
Discographies of American artists
Soul music discographies